Kondo is a Japanese surname.

Kondo or Kondō may also refer to:

Kondo, Kale, Burma
Kondo, Mali
 Kon-dō (literally  in Japanese), is usually the main hall of a Buddhist temple, e.g. in Hōryū-ji, Nara Prefecture
 In physics, the Kondo effect regards the presence of a magnetic impurity in a solid
 Kondo can refer to the KHR-Series humanoid robots manufactured by Kondo Kagaku

People with the surname
For a list of people with this surname, see Kondō.